The cekuntrung is a stringed musical instrument from Indonesia.

It has 4 or 2 strings in single courses. The strings are often made of metal, but sometimes of nylon or fishing line. It can be in the form of a lute/oud or a harp.

References
 The Stringed Instrument Database
 ATLAS of Plucked Instruments 

String instruments
Indonesian musical instruments